Tosin Igho is a Nigerian, Producer and film director.  and has received several Nominations and awards for his work .

Films directed by Tosin Igho  The Eve, Nneka the pretty serpent and  Seven.

Suspicion (2022 film) is due to be released 2023

Content Produced by Tosin Igho includes Judging matters (court reality), Love come back (reality), Venge TeleNovela, Iamlaycon (reality) once Upon a Time (a Children's show )

Life and career 
Tosin is the son of NTA veteran Peter Igho. He obtained his first degree in Visual Effects from the prestigious AFDA in Cape Town, South Africa and bagged another bachelor's degree in the motion picture medium. He started his career as a musician and then directed music videos. He has directed music Videos for famous musicians such as Mo hits  D'banj, Terry G, Faze, Yung L, Aramide and Sammie Okposo.  DJ Jimmy just Pqsuare is the CEO of Divergent films and Managing director of Remote Productions.

Filmography
He is an executive producer with hit tv shows like Once Upon A Time, Judging Matters, Love Come Back,I am Laycon.

And the director of the film Seven 2019 and is working on Suspicion (2023 scheduled  release date )

References 

Living people
Year of birth missing (living people)
Nigerian male actors
Nigerian film producers
Nigerian film directors
Nigerian cinematographers
Nigerian film actors
Nigerian musicians
Africa Magic Viewers' Choice Awards winners
Nigerian television actors
Igbo actors
Nigerian male musicians
Nigerian chief executives